The Council of Higher Education (YÖK; also translated as Higher Education Board) is responsible for the supervision of universities in Turkey, in a capacity defined by article 130 of the 1982 constitution. The current president of the council is Erol Özvar, a former professor of the Marmara University and was appointed by Recep Tayyip Erdoğan.

Organisation 
On the 24 members seven are nominated by the president of Turkey, seven by the Inter University Council, seven by the Council of Ministers, one by the Armed Forces and two by the Ministry of Education. All nominations  had to be confirmed by the president of Turkey. The main task of the YÖK is to receive and approve the budgets from the Universities and suggest people to a University rectorship to the president. The YÖK also receives reports from the Universities and their performances.

A Higher Educational Supervisory Council supervises the universities and consists of ten members. Five members from the YÖK one is appointed by the Ministry of Education, one by the Armed Forces, one by the Supreme Court, another from the State Accounting Bureau and one Council of State.

History 
In the 1980s, professors were encouraged to instill the students the values of family, nationalism and Turkishness, to serve the country and put the personal needs aside.

In 1992, the YÖK established a scholarship program to be able assign qualified professors to the 24 newly established Universities outside of the cities Ankara, Izmir and Istanbul. It selected students to study abroad who in exchange would teach at Turkish universities for the double amount of years their studies abroad were supported. The program was initiated by Mehmet Sağlam, the president of the YÖK at the time.

See also 
 Turkish Academy of Sciences (TÜBA)
 Scientific and Technological Research Council of Turkey (TÜBİTAK)

References

External links 

Educational organizations based in Turkey
Regulation in Turkey
Government agencies of Turkey
Ministry of National Education (Turkey)
Higher education authorities